Tour Poitou-Charentes en Nouvelle-Aquitaine is a road bicycle race held annually in the former region of Poitou-Charentes (now Nouvelle-Aquitaine) France. It was first held in 1987 and since 2005 it has been organised as a 2.1 event on the UCI Europe Tour.

Winners

External links
  

UCI Europe Tour races
Recurring sporting events established in 1987
1987 establishments in France
Cycle races in France